Dr. Andor László (24 December 1914 – 8 August 1993) was a Hungarian economist, who served as Governor of the Hungarian National Bank from 1 November 1961 to 10 July 1975.

See also
National Bank of Hungary

References

1914 births
1993 deaths
Governors of the Hungarian National Bank
Writers from Budapest
20th-century  Hungarian economists